Odostomia vicola is a species of sea snail, a marine gastropod mollusk in the family Pyramidellidae, the pyrams and their allies.

Description
The vitreous shell has an ovate shape. Its length measures 2.5 mm. The whorls of the protoconch are large, deeply immersed in the
first of the succeeding turns, above which the tilted edge of the last volution only projects, which is marked by five slender spiral threads. The five whorls of the teleoconch are rounded on all but the first whorl. They are marked by very broad, strong, retractive axial ribs, of which 16 occur upon the second and third and 20 upon the penultimate turn. In addition to the axial ribs the whorls are marked by four very broad, low spiral cords, which are separated by mere incised lines between the sutures. This renders their junction with the axial ribs very strongly nodulous. The sutures are constricted, showing a portion of the peripheral cord. The periphery of the body whorl is marked by a strong, well rounded spiral cord. The base of the body whorl is decidedly attenuated. It is marked by seven subequal spiral cords, the spaces between which are marked by numerous slender, axial threads. The aperture is elongate-ovate, and decidedly effuse anteriorly. The posterior angle acute. The outer lip is thin, showing the external sculpture within. It is rendered sinuous by the spiral cords. The columella is long, moderately strong, somewhat sinuous, reflected, reinforced by the base, and provided with a fold at its insertion.

Distribution
The type species was found in the Pacific Ocean off San Pedro Bay, California.

References

External links
 ITIS

vicola
Gastropods described in 1909